Arsenic tribromide is the inorganic compound with the formula AsBr3.  This pyramidal molecule is the only known binary arsenic bromide.  AsBr3 is noteworthy for its very high refractive index of approximately 2.3. It also has a very high diamagnetic susceptibility.  The compound exists as colourless deliquescent crystals that fume in moist air.

Preparation
Arsenic tribromide can be prepared by the direct bromination of arsenic powder.  Alternatively, arsenic(III) oxide can be used as the precursor in the presence of elemental sulfur: 
2 As2O3  +  3 S  +  6 Br2   →   4 AsBr3  +  3 SO2

Bromides of arsenic
AsBr5 is not known, although the corresponding phosphorus compound PBr5 is well characterized. AsBr3 is the parent for a series of hypervalent anionic bromoarsenates including [As2Br8]2−, [As2Br9]3−, and [As3Br12]3−.

This synthesis is similar to the direct process used for the synthesis of methyl chlorosilanes.

Safety
Arsenic tribromide is toxic, as are most arsenic compounds.

References

Arsenic(III) compounds
Arsenic halides
Bromides
Carcinogens
Teratogens